Čunovo is a small part of Bratislava, Slovakia, in the southern area near the Hungarian border. It is located close to the Gabčíkovo - Nagymaros Dams.

History 
Čunovo was first mentioned as a village in 1232 under the name Chun. In the 16th century, Croats fleeing from the Ottomans in the south settled in the village. Until 1947, Čunovo, along with Jarovce and Rusovce, was part of Hungary and was annexed that year with the two others to Czechoslovakia, to enable construction of the Port of Bratislava. It became an official part of Bratislava on January 1, 1972. Some of the inhabitants still use the Croatian language and preserve folk traditions.

Tourism 
In 2000, a new art museum called Danubiana was opened. Dunajské luhy Protected Landscape Area comprises some parts of the borough.  It is home to Čunovo Water Sports Centre an artificial whitewater facility built in 1996 which attracts paddlers from around the world.

Transport 
Čunovo is close to the international motorway E65/E75 and railway crossing to Hungary. The first town inside Hungary is Rajka.

Since 21 December 2007, all border controls have been lifted as Hungary and Slovakia became part of the Schengen Area.

Demographics
According to the 2011 census, the municipality had 1,010 inhabitants. 778 of inhabitants were Slovaks, 124 Croats, 66 Hungarians and 42 others and unspecified.

Gallery

References

External links 
 Čunovo website

Boroughs of Bratislava
Croatian communities in Slovakia
Hungary–Slovakia border crossings
Villages in Slovakia merged with towns